The 2006 California Courts of Appeal election was held November 7.
The judges of the California Courts of Appeal are either approved to remain in their seat or rejected by the voters. All of the judges kept their seats.

Results
The following results are from the California Secretary of State.

District 1

Division 1

Division 2

Division 3

Division 4

Division 5

District 2

Division 1

Division 2

Division 3

Division 4

Division 5

Division 6

Division 7

Division 8

District 3

District 4

Division 1

Division 2

Division 3

District 5

District 6

References

See also

Courts of Appeal elections, 2006
2006 Courts of Appeal